Australia Service Medal and Australian Service Medal may refer to:
Australia Service Medal 1939–1945
Australian Service Medal 1945–1975
Australian Service Medal (1975–2012)
Australian Operational Service Medal (2012–)

See also
Australian Active Service Medal 1945–1975
Australian Active Service Medal (1975–2012)
Australian General Service Medal Korea (1953–1956)
General Service Medal (1918) (1918–1962)
General Service Medal (1962) (1962–2007)